The  is a professional wrestling championship and the top singles accomplishment in the Japanese promotion Pro-Wrestling Basara. The title was established in 2013.

History
Union Pro Wrestling was a promotion that was revived by DDT Pro-Wrestling in 2005. The Union Max Championship was established in 2013 when Ivan Markov defeated Shuji Ishikawa to become the inaugural champion. In January 2016, three days after folding, Union was replaced by a new promotion named Pro-Wrestling Basara. The title was reactivated when Isami Kodaka defeated Trans-Am★Hiroshi to win his third title. The original belt design is still used which bears the "Union" name on it.

, there have been seventeen reigns shared among eleven wrestlers. Isami Kodaka is the current champion in his fifth reign.

Reigns

Combined reigns

See also

Professional wrestling in Japan

References

External links
  Union Pro MAX Championship

DDT Pro-Wrestling championships
Pro-Wrestling Basara championships
Openweight wrestling championships